Maintenance fee may refer to:
 Maintenance, repair, and operations, fees paid by tenants for the upkeep of the building
 A fee to be paid to maintain a patent or patent application into force, see maintenance fee (patent)
 A management fee, see Mutual fund fees and expenses
 Maintenance fee (EPA), the annual fees paid by pesticide manufacturers and formulators to continue registration of pesticide active ingredients and products with the Environmental Protection Agency